Danish-Baltic Auxiliary Corps (DBAC) was a Danish company of military volunteers, established 1919 as a non-governmental initiative to help in the Estonian and Latvian war of independence. It was originally planned to send several companies to help, but due to the success of war, only one company was sent, . The company consisted of approximately 200 men with Captain Iver de Hemmer Gudme as corps commander and Captain Richard Gustav Borgelin as company commander.

History 
DBAC left on th 26 March 1919 for Hanko in Finland on board the Finnish ship M/S Merkur.

DBAC was contracted by the Estonian Army and participated on its side in the months of May to August 1919 during the Estonian War of Independence and the Latvian War of Independence.

After the successful campaign, the DBAC was pulled back to Estonia, since the political conflicts between Baltische Landeswehr and the Latvian Army was not part of the contract. At the end of July 1919 DBAC was sent to a section of the eastern front between Ostrov and Porkhov in the Russian Pskov Governorate, which turned out to be a bloody experience and costly to the corps (four dead, twenty wounded and four prisoners of war). On 2 September 1919, the Danish-Baltic Auxiliary Corps marched through Tallinn to their ship Kalevipolg, in a victory parade with over 1000 Estonian soldiers, Johan Laidoner and Otto Strandman participating.

On 22 June 2013, a memorial for the Danish volunteers was revealed in Estonia.

References

External links 

 List of members of Danish-Baltic Auxiliary Corps (in Danish)
 Estonia 1918 - 1920 (in Danish)

Estonian War of Independence
Army units and formations of Denmark
1919 establishments in Denmark
1919 disestablishments in Denmark
Military units and formations of Estonia
Military history of Denmark